
Tuviah Friedman (23 January 1922 – 13 January 2011) was a Nazi hunter and director of the Institute for the Documentation of Nazi War Crimes in Haifa, Israel.

Friedman was born in Radom, Poland, in 1922. During World War II he was imprisoned in a Nazi concentration camp near Radom, from which he escaped in 1944. The following year he was appointed an interrogation officer in the Gdańsk jail. From 1946 to 1952 he worked for Haganah Wien in Austria, as Director of Staff of the Documentation Center in Vienna, where he and his colleagues hunted down numerous Nazis. Afterwards, in Israel, he played a role in the capture of Adolf Eichmann.

Papers
Friedman's autobiography is titled The Hunter. The archives at Yad Vashem in Israel contain dossiers on various Nazis, collected by Friedman.

See also
 Serge and Beate Klarsfeld
 Yaron Svoray
 Elliot Welles
 Simon Wiesenthal
 Efraim Zuroff

References

External links
Guide to the Papers of Tuviah Friedman (RG 1196), YIVO Institute for Jewish Research
My Role in Operation Eichmann by Tuviah Friedman. Institute of Documentation in Israel for the Investigation of Nazi War Crimes: Haifa.
 Korrespondenz Lothar Hermann Coronel Suarez Argentinien Ergreifung Adolf Eichmann, Special Collection 8 
 Tuviah Friedman Korrespondenz to Simon Wiesenthal, Germany National Bibliothek  

1922 births
2011 deaths
Adolf Eichmann
Israeli autobiographers
Jewish concentration camp survivors
Nazi hunters
People from Radom
Polish emigrants to Israel
20th-century Polish Jews
Polish expatriates in Austria